The 1935 Open Championship was the 70th Open Championship, played 26–28 June at Muirfield in Gullane, East Lothian, Scotland. Alf Perry won his only major title, four strokes ahead of runner-up Alf Padgham.

Qualifying took place on 24–25 June, Monday and Tuesday, with 18 holes at Muirfield and 18 holes at the number 1 course Gullane, and the top 100 and ties qualified. Defending champion Henry Cotton led the field on 141; the qualifying score was 153 and 109 players advanced.

Cotton opened with 68 to take the lead on Wednesday, with Perry a stroke behind. Charles Whitcombe carded his own 68 in the second round and led by three over Cotton and Padgham after 36 holes, with Perry falling five back. The top sixty and ties would make the cut for the final 36 holes; it was at 153 (+9) and 62 advanced.

In the third round on Friday morning, it was Perry who caught fire with 67 to move ahead of Cotton and Whitcombe, who shot 76 and 73, respectively. A 72 in the final round that afternoon put Perry at 283, four strokes ahead of runner-up Padgham. Whitcombe finished one back in third, while Cotton had 75 and fell into a tie for seventh at 293. Amateur Lawson Little, the reigning British Amateur champion, shot 69 and climbed into a tie for fourth at 289. Perry's winning total equaled the tournament scoring record. Padgham won the following year at Hoylake.

Perry's win was his first in an important professional tournament, and he won just three more times. He finished third in 1939, but otherwise had no other top-10 finishes in a major championship. Perry was a member of three Ryder Cup teams in 1933, 1935, and 1937.

Course

Past champions in the field

Made the cut 

Source:

Missed the cut 

Source:

Did not advance past qualifying rounds (Monday & Tuesday):
Ted Ray (1912) 155, Sandy Herd (1902) 158, James Braid (1901, 1905, 1906, 1908, 1910) 164.

Did not enter:
 Denny Shute (1933), Gene Sarazen (1932), Tommy Armour (1931), Bobby Jones (1926, 1927, 1930),Walter Hagen (1922, 1924, 1928, 1929), Jim Barnes (1925), Jock Hutchison (1921).

Round summaries

First round
Wednesday, 26 June 1935

Source:

Second round
Thursday, 27 June 1935

Source:

Third round
Friday, 28 June 1935 (morning)

Source:

Final round
Friday, 28 June 1935 (afternoon)

Source:

Amateurs: Little (+1), Lucas (+12), Risdon (+13), Rutherford (+17), McLean (+19),Sweeny (+19), McRuvie (+20), Thomson (+21), Francis (+22).

References

External links
Muirfield 1935 (Official site)

The Open Championship
Golf tournaments in Scotland
Open Championship
Open Championship
Open Championship